Carmine bee-eater may refer to:

 Northern carmine bee-eater (Merops nubicus or Merops nubicus nubicus)
 Southern carmine bee-eater (Merops nubicoides or Merops nubicus nubicoides)

Birds by common name